Hell Freezes Over is the second live album by the Eagles, released in 1994. The album is the first to be released after the Eagles had reformed following a fourteen-year-long break up. The band's lineup was that of the Long Run era: Glenn Frey, Don Henley, Don Felder, Joe Walsh, and Timothy B. Schmit. It contains four new studio tracks and eleven tracks recorded live in April 1994 for an MTV special. Two Top 40 Mainstream singles, "Get Over It" and "Love Will Keep Us Alive", were released from the album. It also features an acoustic version of "Hotel California". The four new studio recordings are the last to feature Don Felder, who was fired from the band in 2001.

The album went to No. 1 on the Billboard album chart upon its release where it stayed for two weeks. The album has sold over 9 million copies in the United States.

Hell Freezes Over was also released in video form on VHS, LaserDisc and DVD. Before the album was released, the Eagles also started a tour, which would last from 1994 to 1996 and became one of the most successful tours in music history.

Background
The album name is in reference to a quote by Don Henley after the band's breakup in 1980. Henley was asked in an interview about when the band would play together again, to which he responded "when Hell freezes over". Glenn Frey also said in 1982 on the break-up: "I just rule out the possibility of putting the Eagles back together for a Lost Youth and Greed tour."

In 1993, an Eagles tribute album, Common Thread: The Songs of the Eagles, was recorded by several country artists. Travis Tritt, who covered "Take It Easy" in the album, asked the band to appear in his video for the song. The former Eagles band members agreed, and it would be the first time the group had appeared together in 13 years. Two months later, Glenn Frey and Henley had lunch with their management and decided to reunite.

The band members performed live for the first time in April 1994 at Warner Bros. Studios in Burbank, California for an MTV special. The recording sessions produced 11 tracks for the Hell Freezes Over album, including a new arrangement of "Hotel California" that features an extended acoustic guitar and percussion opening. At the beginning of the concert, Frey joked to the audience: "For the record, we never broke up; we just took a 14-year vacation". The tour began on May 27, and the Hell Freezes Over album was released on November 8, 1994. The album is the band's second live album, after their live album in 1980.

A new song "Get Over It" became a modest hit and another new song, "Love Will Keep Us Alive", reached No. 1 on the Billboard Adult Contemporary chart.

The DVD is one of the first music releases to feature a DTS format soundtrack in addition to a PCM stereo soundtrack. The DVD also featured the song "Seven Bridges Road" in DTS audio only. The DVD has since been re-released with an additional Dolby Digital soundtrack. The album was also released as a DTS CD in 1997.

Track listing

All new songs were released as studio recordings on the album, but can be seen live on the VHS and DVD versions.
"Seven Bridges Road" – DTS – A remastered version of the recording featured on Eagles Live, with a clearer separation of the five vocal parts to exploit the full potential of a 5.1 speaker set-up: Timothy B. Schmit is on the rear-right, Glenn Frey as the singer of the song's main melody on the front-right, Don Henley on the front-left and Joe Walsh on the rear-left. Don Felder is on the front-center channel.

Personnel
Compiled from Hell Freezes Over liner notes.

Eagles
 Don Henley – drums, acoustic guitar, percussion, vocals
 Timothy B. Schmit – bass guitar, vocals
 Glenn Frey – electric and acoustic guitar, piano, keyboards, vocals
 Don Felder – electric guitar, acoustic guitar, pedal steel guitar, mandolin, vocals
 Joe Walsh – electric, acoustic, and slide guitar, organ, vocals

Additional personnel
 John Corey – piano
 Scott Crago – percussion, drums
 Timothy Drury – keyboards, vocals
 Stan Lynch – percussion
 Jay Oliver – organ, keyboards, piano
 Paulinho Da Costa – percussion
 Gary Grimm – percussion
 Brian Matthews – Electro-Theremin
 Al Garth – trumpet on "New York Minute"
 Burbank Philharmonic Orchestra – backup on tracks 7-11, 15 (CD); tracks 7-12, 17 (DVD)

Production
 Eagles – production (all tracks)
 Elliot Scheiner – production (all tracks except "Learn to Be Still")
 Rob Jacobs – production (all tracks)
 Stan Lynch – production ("Learn to Be Still" only)
 Joel Stillerman – executive producer
 Carol Donovan – program producer
 Beth McCarthy – program director
 Audrey Johns – program line producer
 Rob Jacobs, Elliot Scheiner – engineers
 Charlie Bouis, Carl Glanville, Barry Goldberg, Andy Grassi, Tom Trafalski,Ken Villeneuve, Tom Winslow – second engineers
 Todd Bowie and Chris Buttleman – guitar technician
 Ted Jensen – mastering
 Rob Jacobs, Dave Kob, Dave Reynolds, Elliot Scheiner – mixing
 Adam Armstrong – vocal technician
 Ted Jensen – editing
 Don Davis, The Eagles, Jay Oliver – horn and string arrangements
 David Hewitt – live recording coordinator
 John Halpern, David Skernick – photography
 Keith Raywood – production design
 Robin Sloane, Janet Wolsborn – art direction
 Dwaine "The Peachin' Trucker" Wise – road manager
 Andrew Lopez – head driver

Charts

Weekly charts

Year-end charts

Decade-end charts

Video/DVD

Certifications

Album

Video/DVD

References

Live video albums
1994 live albums
1994 video albums
Geffen Records live albums
Geffen Records video albums
Eagles (band) live albums
Eagles (band) video albums
Albums recorded at A&M Studios